is an autobahn in Germany, linking the A 59 to the A 61.

The oldest section of the A 565 was built in 1959, a branch of the Cologne - Bonn road. This short autobahn, which served as bypass of Bonn, ran from the present-day location of the interchange Bonn-Nord, over the Tausendfüßler bridge, and ending at the current junction Bonn-Endenich. This section was built with two lanes in each direction and was never widened, making it one of the busiest stretches of autobahn in Germany. Later, the road was extended to Lengsdorf, the present-day site of the junction Bonn-Lengsdorf. In 1967, the highway was further extended to the north, across the Rhine and up to the A 170 Flughafenautobahn (present-day A 59). At this point, various sections of the Bonn bypass was signed as the B 56n, the B 9n, and the B 257n from there to Lengsdorf. Next, work focused on the southern end of the road. The section from Lengsdorf to Meckenheim-Nord was opened in 1971. The road was designated entirely as the A 221 along with the opening of that section. The southernmost portion, from the A 61 to the end of the autobahn, opened in 1973; the remaining portion from the A 61 to Meckenheim-Nord opened two years later. In between the two openings, in 1974, the autobahn received the designation of A 565.

Exit list

|-
| 
| style="text-align:right; padding:0 .5em;" | (4)
| 4-way interchange Bonn-Nord 
Access to/from  southbound only

Access to/from  northbound only

Access to/from  northbound only

|-
| 
| style="text-align:right; padding:0 .5em;" | (12)
| 4-way interchange Meckenheim 

Road continues as the B 257 towards Altenahr
|}

External links
 Autobahn Atlas: A565


565